ADP/ATP translocase 3, also known as solute carrier family 25 member 6, is a protein that in humans is encoded by the SLC25A6 gene.

Identical copies of this gene reside on the pseudoautosomal regions of the X and Y chromosomes.

See also 
 Adenine nucleotide translocator
 Solute carrier family

References

Further reading

Solute carrier family